Perigone can refer to:

 In botany, the perianth of a flower, the perigonium
 In Greek mythology, Perigune
 In zoology, part of the gonophore of a Hydroid